Vipin is an Indian name. It may refer to:

Vipin Aneja, Indian singer
Vipin Buckshey (born 1955), Indian optometrist
Vipin Handa (born 1956), Indian film producer
Vipin Patwa (born 1982), Indian music director
Vipin Pubby (born 1956), Indian journalist
Vipin Sharma (born 1979), Indian actor
Vipin Vijay (born 1977), Indian film director
Devang Vipin Khakhar (born 1959), Indian chemical engineer
Siddharth Vipin, Indian music composer
Vipin Itankar (born 1984), Indian Administrative Service Officer, Collector of Nagpur

References

Indian masculine given names